Angelo Michele Cavazzoni or Cavazzone (Bologna, 1672 - 1743) was an Italian painter and engraver. He trained with Giovanni Gioseffo Santi. He became Prince of the Accademia Clementina in Bologna. Among his pupils was Bernardo Minozzi.

References

1672 births
1743 deaths
17th-century Italian painters
Italian male painters
18th-century Italian painters
Italian engravers
Painters from Bologna
18th-century Italian male artists